The 1929 Baylor Bears football team represented Baylor University in the Southwest Conference (SWC) during the 1929 college football season. In their fourth season under head coach Morley Jennings, the Bears compiled a 7–3–1 record (2–2–1 against conference opponents), finished in fifth place in the conference, and outscored opponents by a combined total of 291 to 106. They played their home games at Cotton Palace in Waco, Texas. Charles Weldon Lucas was the team captain.

Schedule

References

Baylor
Baylor Bears football seasons
Baylor Bears football